Jonathan Narh Ayertey is a Ghanaian entomologist and academic. In 2004 he was inducted as a fellow of the Ghana Academy of Arts and Sciences.

References

Living people
Ghanaian biologists
Year of birth missing (living people)
Fellows of the Ghana Academy of Arts and Sciences
Place of birth missing (living people)
Entomologists
21st-century Ghanaian people